Musina Glacier is the 7 km long and 3.5 km wide glacier on Oscar II Coast, Graham Land in Antarctica situated south of Green Glacier and north of Evans Glacier.  Draining eastwards between the two principal branches of Rugate Ridge to flow into Vaughan Inlet, Weddell Sea.

The feature is named after the settlement of Musina in northern Bulgaria.

Location

Maps
 Antarctic Digital Database (ADD). Scale 1:250000 topographic map of Antarctica. Scientific Committee on Antarctic Research (SCAR). Since 1993, regularly upgraded and updated.

References
 Musina Glacier. SCAR Composite Antarctic Gazetteer.
 Bulgarian Antarctic Gazetteer. Antarctic Place-names Commission. (details in Bulgarian, basic data in English)

External links
 Musina Glacier. Copernix satellite image

Glaciers of Oscar II Coast
Bulgaria and the Antarctic